Andrei Pavel and Alexander Waske were the defending champions. Pavel did not participate this year.  Waske partnered with Julian Knowle, losing in the first round.

Philipp Kohlschreiber and Mikhail Youzhny won in the final 6–1, 6–4, against Jan Hájek and Jaroslav Levinský.

Seeds

Draw

Draw

External links
Draw

BMW Open - Doubles